The 2021–22 season was Rio Ave F.C.'s first season back in second division of the Portuguese football league, the Liga Portugal 2, and the 83rd as a football club.

Players

First-team squad

Out on loan

Competitions

Overall record

Serie A

League table

Results summary

Results by round

Matches
The league fixtures were announced on 8 July 2021.

Taça de Portugal

Taça da Liga

Third round

References

Rio Ave F.C. seasons
Rio Ave